Taivo Arak (2 November 1946, Tallinn – 17 October 2007, Stockholm) was an Estonian mathematician, specializing in probability theory.

Biography
In 1969 he graduated from Leningrad State University. There he received in 1972 his Russian candidate degree (Ph.D.) under I. A. Ibragimov.

In 1983 Arak defended his dissertation for his Russian doctorate (higher doctoral degree similar to habilitation).

From 1972 to 1981 he worked at the Tallinn University of Technology. From 1981 he worked at the Institute of Cybernetics of the Academy of Sciences of the Estonian SSR. In 1986 he was an Invited Speaker at the International Congress of Mathematicians in Berkeley, California.

Most of his research dealt with the theory of probability.

Awards
  (1983) - for the series of papers "Равномерные предельные теоремы для сумм независимых случайных величин" (Uniform limit theorems for sums of independent random variables).

Selected publications
 with Andrei Yuryevich Zaitsev: 
 with Donatas Surgailis: 
 with D. Surgailis: 
 with Peter Clifford and D. Surgailis:

References

External links
Арак Тайво Викторович, ras.ru
Arak Taivo Viktorovich, list of publications. mathnet.ru

1946 births
2007 deaths
Estonian mathematicians
Probability theorists
Saint Petersburg State University alumni
Academic staff of the Tallinn University of Technology
People from Tallinn